Jerome Davis Greene (October 12, 1874March 29, 1959) was an American banker and a trustee to several major  organizations and trusts including the Brookings Institution and the Rockefeller Foundation.

Family
Greene was born in Yokohama, Japan to missionary parents Mary Jane Forbes and the Rev. Daniel Crosby Greene. He was also the brother of diplomat Roger Sherman Greene II, the nephew of famed historian Evarts Boutell Greene, and his grandmother was the sister of former US Senator, US Secretary of State, and US Attorney General William Maxwell Evarts. The great-nephew of US Senator George Frisbie Hoar, US Senator and Connecticut Governor Roger Sherman Baldwin, US Attorney General and Chief Justice of the Massachusetts Supreme Judicial Court Ebenezer Rockwood Hoar, as well as the nephew of the Chief Justice of the Supreme Court of the Washington Territory, Justice Roger Sherman Greene.

Early years
Greene graduated from Harvard College by 1897 and became secretary to Harvard University's president and the Harvard Corporation from 1901-1910. This gave him contacts with Wall Street which made him general manager of the Rockefeller Institute from 1910-1912.  Later, Greene became an assistant to John D. Rockefeller in philanthropic work for two years, then trustee to the Rockefeller Institute, to the Rockefeller Foundation, and finally to the Rockefeller General Education Board until 1939.

For fifteen years (1917-1932) he worked for the Boston investment banking firm of Lee, Higginson & Co; most of those years serving as its chief executive officer, as well as with its London branch. He was executive secretary of the American section of the Allied Maritime Transport Council stationed in London, England 1918.  He lived in Toynbee Hall, the world's first settlement house.  This brought him in contact with the Round Table Group in England, a contact which was strengthened in 1919 when he became secretary to the Reparations Commission at the Paris Peace Conference. Accordingly, on his return to the United States he was one of the early figures in the establishment of the Council on Foreign Relations which served as the New York branch of the Lionel Curtis Institute of International Affairs.

As an investment banker, Greene is mainly remembered for his sales of millions of dollars of the fraudulent securities of the Swedish match king, Ivar Kreuger. That Greene offered these to the American investing public in good faith is evident from the fact that he put a substantial part of his own fortune in the same investments. As a consequence, Kreuger's suicide in Paris in April 1932 left Greene with little money and no job. He wrote to Lionel Curtis asking for help and was given, for two years, a professorship in international relations at Aberystwyth, Wales. The Round Table Group controlled the professorship from its founding by David Davies in 1919, though Davies had broken with the Round Table because of its subversion of the League of Nations and European collective security.

On his return to America in 1934, Greene also returned to his secretaryship of the Harvard Corporation and became, for the remainder of his life, a trustee and officer of the Boston Symphony Orchestra, the Gardner Museum in Fenway Court, the New England Conservatory of Music, the American Academy in Rome, the Brookings Institution, the Rockefeller Foundation, and the General Education Board (only until 1939). He was also the director of the Harvard University's year-long 1936 wikt:Tercentenary Celebration.

Greene is of much greater significance in indicating the real influences within the Institute of Pacific Relations than any Communists or fellow travelers. He wrote the constitution for the IPR in 1916. For years he was the chief conduit for Wall Street funds and influence into the organization.  Additionally, Greene was treasurer of the American Council for three years and chairman for three more, as well as chairman of the International Council for four years.

Round table

He became involved with the Round Table Groups, which were semi-secret discussion and lobbying groups organized by Lionel Curtis, Philip Henry Kerr (Lord Lothian), and (Sir) William S. Marris in 1908-1911. This was done on behalf of Lord Milner, the dominant Trustee of the Rhodes Trust in the two decades 1905-1925. The original purpose of these groups was to seek to federate the English-speaking world along lines laid down by Cecil Rhodes (1853-1902) and William T. Stead (1849-1912), and the money for the organizational work came originally from the Rhodes Trust. By 1915 Round Table groups existed in seven countries, including England, South Africa, Canada, Australia, New Zealand, India, and a rather loosely organized group in the United States (George Louis Beer, Walter Lippmann, Frank Aydelotte, Whitney Shepardson, Thomas W. Lamont, Erwin D. Canham of the Christian Science Monitor, and others). The attitudes of the various groups were coordinated by frequent visits and discussions and by a well-informed and totally anonymous quarterly magazine, The Round Table Journal, whose first issue, largely written by Philip Kerr, appeared in November 1910.

The leaders of this group were: Milner, until his death in 1925, followed by Curtis (1872-1955), Robert H, (Lord) Brand  (brother -in-law of Lady Astor) until his death in 1963, and now Adam D. Marris, son of Sir William and Brand's successor as managing director of Lazard Frères bank. The original intention had been to have collegial leadership, but Milner was too secretive and headstrong to share the role. He did so only in the period 1913-1919 when he held regular meetings with some of his closest friends to coordinate their activities as a pressure group in the struggle with Wilhelmine Germany. This they called their "Ginger Group." After Milner's death in 1925, the leadership was largely shared by the survivors of Milner's "Kindergarten," that is, the group of young Oxford men whom he used as civil servants in his reconstruction of South Africa in 1901-1910. Brand was the last survivor of the "Kindergarten"; since his death, the greatly reduced activities of the organization have been exercised largely through the Editorial Committee of The Round Table magazine under Adam Marris.

Money for the widely ramified activities of this organization came originally from the associates and followers of Cecil Rhodes, chiefly from the Rhodes Trust itself, and from wealthy associates such as the Beit brothers, from Sir Abe Bailey, and (after 1915) from the Astor family. Since 1925 there have been substantial contributions from wealthy individuals and from foundations and firms associated with the international banking fraternity, especially the Carnegie United Kingdom Trust and other organizations associated with J. P. Morgan, the Rockefeller and Whitney families, and the associates of Lazard Frères and of Morgan, Grenfell & Company.

Summary of positions

Jerome Davis Greene was a partner in Lee, Higginson & Co., Secretary to the Corporation, Harvard University, 1905-1910 & 1934-1943; Joint Secretary of the Reparations Committee at the Paris Peace Conference in 1919; Secretary and Trustee, the Rockefeller Foundation, 1913-17 & 1928-1939; Chairman, Council Institute of Pacific Relations, (1929–32); a Trustee, the Brookings Institution of Washington D.C., 1928-1945.

References

External links
History of the Department of International Politics
TIME:God & Man at Harvard
Harvard University. Tercentenary Celebration Office
The Rockefeller Foundation Timeline
[https://www.amazon.com/1910-Photo-Jerome-D-Greene/dp/B018E3RH5U Historic Photographs, LLC Photo: Jerome Davis Greene,1874-1959, American Banker,Trustee to Rockefeller Foundation
WorldCat Identities
Rockefeller Foundation 1915 Annual Report
Jerome Davis Greene is appointed the third Woodrow Wilson Chair of International Politics
The Half Open Door
Find A Grave Memorial
Rockefeller Foundation
Obit Harvard Crimson

American bankers
American lawyers
Rockefeller Foundation people
Harvard College alumni
1874 births
1959 deaths
American expatriates in Japan